Peperomia congona is a species of plant in the genus Peperomia. Its native range is Ecuador and Peru.

References

congona
Flora of Peru
Flora of Ecuador
Plants described in 1900
Medicinal plants of South America